George Godfrey (20 March 1853 – 17 October 1901), nicknamed Old Chocolate by the press of the day in the last stage of his long career, was a Black Canadian heavyweight boxer who held the distinction of being World 'Colored' Heavyweight Champion during his career. Godfrey was inducted into the PEI Sports Hall of Fame in 1990.

Biography

Early life 
Godfrey was born to William Godfrey and Sarah Byers in an area of Charlottetown known as the Bog, a poor part of the west end. He first received boxing instructions while still residing in Charlottetown, from Dick Cronin. Godfrey then left Canada to find employment as a porter in Boston's silk importing offices. After winning in the heavyweight class at a local boxing competition in 1879, he began boxing professionally. At a fighting weight of 175 pounds on a  frame, he would be considered a light-heavyweight by modern standards. However, despite being  undersized and rather old at 27 years of age to begin prizefighting, Godfrey would go on to achieve tremendous success inside the boxing ring.

Professional career 
Godfrey went 4-0-4 in his first eight fights, which included a draw with famed pugilist Jake Kilrain. In just his ninth pro bout, he won the World 'Colored' Heavyweight Champion by beating Charles Hadley via sixth-round knockout on 23 February 1883. On 24 August 1888, at age 36, Godfrey faced off against world renowned Australian boxer Peter Jackson in San Francisco, California. He would end up losing the bout by technical knockout in the nineteenth round, subsequently losing the World 'Colored' Title. Godfrey had two more bouts with the much heavier Kilrain after their initial draw, losing both of them via knockout. He also faced Ireland's Peter Maher and California Joe Choynski towards the latter part of his career, almost 40 years old, also losing those matchups. It was during the last stages of his career, as the years took their toll and his ring skills visibly faded, that the unenlightened press of the day took to calling him by the deprecatory sobriquet of "Old Chocolate".

Godfrey spent nearly his entire career chasing eventual World Heavyweight Champion John L. Sullivan, who repeatedly refused to fight black contenders. However, in 1881 a story surfaced that a bare-knuckle fight against Sullivan had been scheduled but was stopped by the Boston police due to boxing being illegal in the state. This enhanced Godfrey's notoriety and earned him some high-profile matchups with some of the top pugilists of his time period, including the likes of Kilrain, Maher, Jackson and Choynski.

Among the notable fighters that Godfrey beat were Charles Hadley, C.C. Smith, England's "Denver Ed" Smith, McHenry Johnson ("Minneapolis Star"), Irish Joe Lannon, Canada's Patsy Cardiff, Steve O'Donnell of Australia and Joe Doherty.

Death 
Godfrey died of Tuberculosis on 19 October 1901, at his house in Revere, Massachusetts. He had reportedly accumulated considerable real estate in both the Chelsea and Revere areas at the time of his death.

American boxer Feab S. Williams would later use the ring name "George Godfrey" and claimed the same Championship 42 years after his Canadian namesake.

Notable bouts 

| style="text-align:center;" colspan="7"|
|-  style="text-align:center; background:#e3e3e3;"
|  style="border-style:none none solid solid; "|Result
|  style="border-style:none none solid solid; "|Opponent
|  style="border-style:none none solid solid; "|Type
|  style="border-style:none none solid solid; "|Rd., Time
|  style="border-style:none none solid solid; "|Date
|  style="border-style:none none solid solid; "|Location
|  style="border-style:none none solid solid; "|Notes
|- align=center
|style="background:#abcdef;"|Draw
|align=left| Nick Burley
|
|
|
|align=left|
|align=left|
|- align=center
|Loss
|align=left| Peter Maher
|
|
|
|align=left|
|align=left|
|- align=center
|style="background:#abcdef;"|Draw
|align=left| Joe Butler
|
|
|
|align=left|
|align=left|
|- align=center
|style="background:#ddd;"|NC
|align=left| Jim Hall
|
|
|
|align=left|
|align=left|
|- align=center
|Loss
|align=left| Joe Choynski
|
|
|
|align=left|
|align=left|
|- align=center
|Win
|align=left| C.C. Smith
|
|
|
|align=left|
|align=left|
|- align=center
|Loss
|align=left| Jake Kilrain
|
|
|
|align=left|
|align=left|
|- align=center
|Loss
|align=left| Peter Jackson
|
|
|
|align=left|
|align=left|
|- align=center
|style="background:#abcdef;"|Draw
|align=left| C.C. Smith
|
|
|
|align=left|
|align=left|
|- align=center
|Loss
|align=left| Jake Kilrain
|
|
|
|align=left|
|align=left|
|- align=center
|Win
|align=left| Charles Hadley
|
|
|
|align=left|
|align=left|
|- align=center
|style="background:#abcdef;"|Draw
|align=left| Charles Hadley
|
|
|
|align=left|
|align=left|
|- align=center
|style="background:#abcdef;"|Draw
|align=left| Charles Hadley
|
|
|
|align=left|
|align=left|
|- align=center
|style="background:#abcdef;"|Draw
|align=left| Jake Kilrain
|
|
|
|align=left|
|align=left|
|- align=center
|style="background:#abcdef;"|Draw
|align=left| Charles Hadley
|
|
|
|align=left|
|align=left|

See also
List of bare-knuckle boxers

References

Further reading

External links
 
 Biography at the Dictionary of Canadian Biography Online
 Biography at PEI Sports Hall of Fame
 Cyber Boxing Zone Biography

Black Canadian boxers
Heavyweight boxers
World colored heavyweight boxing champions
Canadian expatriate sportspeople in the United States
1853 births
1901 deaths
Bare-knuckle boxers
Sportspeople from Charlottetown
Canadian male boxers
Colony of Prince Edward Island people
20th-century deaths from tuberculosis
Tuberculosis deaths in Massachusetts